Ancepaspidini is a tribe of armored scale insects.

Genera
Ancepaspis
Nudachaspis
Protancepaspis

References

Hemiptera tribes
Diaspidinae